Raymond Hill is a neighborhood in Pasadena, California. The northern part of the district is sometimes referred to as Arroyo Del Mar.
It is an industrial strip about one mile long and 1/4 mile wide; bordered by Del Mar Boulevard to the north, South Pasadena to the south, Fair Oaks Avenue to the west, and Marengo Avenue to the east. When the 710 Freeway is completed, the western boundary will be extended three blocks further.
Despite its name, Raymond Hill itself is a few blocks south of the neighborhood, in South Pasadena.

Manson Murders
During the recent Los Angeles Magazine article on the 40th anniversary of the Charles Manson murders, there have been rumors that there are several unsolved murders that took place in the Raymond Hill  area during the 1960s. Due to the close proximity to Manson's other murders, as well as the similar time frame, the Los Angeles Magazine investigation thinks these unsolved crimes could be tied to Charles Manson. Although the police detectives have tried to deny any connection between these crimes, many citizens in the neighborhood believe Charles Manson was ultimately responsible.

Education
Raymond Hill is served by McKinley School and Blair High School. Mayfield Junior School is a private school in the area.

Transportation
The Metro Gold Line operates a station on Fillmore Street, at the neighborhood's center. Raymond Hill is served by Metro Local lines 260 and 686. It is also served by Pasadena Transit routes 20, 51, 52, and 70.

Neighborhoods in Pasadena, California